Velluvili is a 1978 Malayalam film, starring Soman and Jayabharathi in the lead roles. It marked the directorial debut of K. G. Rajasekharan. It was shot mostly at Perumbavoor, Kerala.

The film released along with the Prem Nazir-starrer Kalpavriksham. It became a commercial success and gave the much needed career break for Soman.

Cast
Jayabharathi as Lakshmi
Jose Prakash as  Minnal Moidu
Prema as  Parvathi 
K. P. Ummer  as 
M. G. Soman as  Soman
Paravoor Bharathan as  Naanu
Sadhana as  Sarojini
Ushakumari as  Savithri
Master Raghu as Pappan
Janardhanan (actor) as  Sreedharan 
 K. P. A. C. Lalitha as  Sarasu 
 Pattom Sadan as  Kuttappan

Soundtrack
The music was composed by M. S. Viswanathan and the lyrics were written by Bichu Thirumala.

References

External links

1970s Malayalam-language films
1978 directorial debut films
1978 films
Films scored by M. S. Viswanathan
Films directed by K. G. Rajasekharan